77th parallel may refer to:

77th parallel north, a circle of latitude in the Northern Hemisphere
77th parallel south, a circle of latitude in the Southern Hemisphere